In enzymology, a dihydropyrimidinase is an enzyme that catalyzes the chemical reaction

5,6-dihydrouracil + H2O  3-ureidopropanoate

Thus, the two substrates of this enzyme are 5,6-dihydrouracil and H2O, whereas its product is 3-ureidopropanoate.

This enzyme belongs to the family of hydrolases, those acting on carbon-nitrogen bonds other than peptide bonds, specifically in cyclic amides.  The systematic name of this enzyme class is 5,6-dihydropyrimidine amidohydrolase. Other names in common use include hydantoinase, hydropyrimidine hydrase, hydantoin peptidase, pyrimidine hydrase, and D-hydantoinase.  This enzyme participates in 3 metabolic pathways: pyrimidine metabolism, beta-alanine metabolism, and pantothenate and coa biosynthesis.

Structural studies

References

 
 

EC 3.5.2
Enzymes of known structure